Nationality words link to articles with information on the nation's poetry or literature (for instance, Irish or France).

Events
Charles Olson publishes his seminal essay, "Projective Verse". In this, he calls for a poetry of "open field" composition to replace traditional closed poetic forms with an improvised form that should reflect exactly the content of the poem. This form is to be based on the line, and each line is to be a unit of breath and of utterance. The content is to consist of "one perception immediately and directly (leading) to a further perception". This essay becomes a kind of de facto manifesto for the Black Mountain poets.
 George Oppen and his wife, Mary, move from the United States to Mexico, where their links to Communism are less problematic.
The Beloit Poetry Journal is founded by Robert Glauber and Chad Walsh. It is intended to be a publication of Beloit College since Walsh is an English teacher there. 
 Pioneer Press founded in Jamaica.
 Saint Lucia Arts Guild founded by Derek and Roderick Walcott.

Works published in English
Listed by nation where the work was first published and again by the poet's native land, if different; substantially revised works listed separately:

Canada
 Dorothy Livesay, Call My People Home, Canada
 James Wreford Watson, Of Time and the Lover (Toronto: McClelland & Stewart).

India, in English
 Sri Aurobindo, Savitri ( Poetry in English ), Pondicherry: Sri Aurobindo Ashram
 R. Bhagavan, Poems ( Poetry in English ), the author's first book of poems, Calcutta: Writers Workshop; India .
 Doreen W. Wickremasinghe, editor, Poems of East & West, Colombo: Colombo Apothecaries Co., 170 pages; anthology; Ceylon (now Sri Lanka),

New Zealand
 Ursula Bethell, Collected Poems, Christchurch: Caxton Press (posthumous)
 Alistair Campbell, Mine Eyes Dazzle, Christchurch: Pegasus Press, including "The Return" and "Elegy"
 M. K. Joseph, Imaginary Islands
 Kendrick Smithyman, The Blind Mountain, Caxton
 Hubert Witheford, The Shadow of the Flame

United Kingdom
 W. H. Auden, Collected Shorter Poems 1930-1944, published March 9; English poet living in the United States at this time
 George Barker, The True Confession of George Barker
 Basil Bunting, Poems: 1950
 Norman Cameron, Forgive Me, Sire, and Other Poems
 Walter de la Mare, Inward Companion, published in October
 Robert Duncan, The Mongrel, and Other Poems
 David Gascoyne, A Vagrant, and Other Poems
 Robert Gittings, Wentworth Place.
 John Heath-Stubbs and David Wright, editors, The Forsaken Garden: An Anthology of Poetry 1824-1909
 John Heath-Stubbs, The Swarming of the Bees
 Margery Lawrence, Fourteen to Forty-Eight: a diary in verse
 Ewart Milne, Diamond Cut Diamond, Irish poet published in the UK
 Mervyn Peake, The Glassblowers
 James Reeves, The Wandering Moon
 Jon Silkin, The Portrait, and Other Poems
 Stevie Smith, Harold's Leap

United States
 W. H. Auden, Collected Shorter Poems 1930-1944 (English poet living at this time in the United States)
 E. E. Cummings, XAIPE: 71 Poems
 Leah Bodine Drake, A Hornbook for Witches
 Robert Duncan, Medieval Scenes
 Richard Eberhart, An Herb Basket
 Robert Lowell, Poems 1938–1949
 Mid-Century American Poets, an anthology including poets who came to prominence in the 1940s, including Robert Lowell, Muriel Rukeyser, Karl Shapiro, Elizabeth Bishop, Theodore Roethke, Randall Jarrell, and John Ciardi
 Theodore Morrison, The Dream of Alcestis
 Howard Nemerov, Guide to the Ruins
 John Frederick Nims, A Fountain in Kentucky
 Ezra Pound, Seventy Cantos
 Carl Sandburg, Complete Poems
 Delmore Schwartz, Vaudeville for a Princess
 William Jay Smith, Celebration at Dark
 Wallace Stevens, The Auroras of Autumn, includes "The Auroras of Autumn," "Large Red Man Reading," "In a Bad Time," "The Ultimate Poem Is Abstract," "Bouquet of Roses in Sunlight," "An Ordinary Evening in New Haven," and "A Primitive Like an Orb"), Knopf
 Peter Viereck, Strike Through the Mask! New Lyrical Poems
 Richard Wilbur, Ceremony and Other Poems, New York: Reynal and Hitchcock
 William Carlos Williams, The Collected Later Poems

Other in English
 Nancy Cato, The Darkened Window, Australia

Works published in other languages
Listed by nation where the work was first published and again by the poet's native land, if different; substantially revised works listed separately:

France
 Aimé Césaire, Corps perdu, Martinique author published in France; Paris: Fragrance
 René Char, Les Matinaux
 Jean Follain, Chef-Lieu
 Jean Grosjean, Hypotases
 Henri Michaux, Passages
 Raymond Queneau, Petite cosmogonie portative
 Roger-Arnould Rivière, Nuit et Jour
 Tristan Tzara, pen name of Sami Rosenstock, Parler seul

Germany
 Berthold Brecht writes the Children's Hymn, a poem protesting what he felt was Nazi corruption of the Deutschlandlied.

Hebrew
 Haim Gouri, Ad A lot Ha-Shahar ("Till Dawn"), poetry and war diary, Israeli writing in Hebrew
 Hillel Omer (who wrote under the name "Ayin Hillel"), Eretz Ha-Tzohorayim ("The Noon Country"), Publisher: Sifriat Poalim; Israel

India
Listed in alphabetical order by first name:

 Bhagvati Charan Varma, Tara, Hindi verse play
 Bhatt Damodar Kesavaji, pen name Sudhansu Ramasagar, Indian, Gujarati
 G. Sankara Kurup, Odakkuzhal (The Bamboo Flute), Malayalam
 Buddhidhari Singha, Aves, Maithili
 Khalilur Rahman, A'inah Khane men, Urdu
 Madhunapantula Satyanarayanashastri, Andhra Racayitalu, Telugu-language poet (surname: Satyanarayanashastri)
 Rentala Gopalakrishna, Sangharsana Telugu
 Subhas Mukhopadhyay, Cirkut, Bengali
 Sreedhara Menon, Srirekha, Malayalam

Other languages
 Nezihe Araz, Benim Dünyam ("My World"), Turkey
 García Baena, Antiguo Muchacho ("Boy of Yore"); Spain
 Alexander Mezhirov, Коммунисты, вперёд! ("Communists, Ahead!"), includes the title poem, which was first published in 1948; reprinted 1952
 Pablo Neruda, Canto General, Chilean poet
 Nizar Qabbani, You Are Mine, Syrian poet writing in Arabic

Awards and honors
 Consultant in Poetry to the Library of Congress (later the post would be called "Poet Laureate Consultant in Poetry to the Library of Congress"): Conrad Aiken appointed this year.
 Harriet Monroe Prize from Poetry magazine: E.E. Cummings
 National Book Award for Poetry: William Carlos Williams, Paterson: Book III and Selected Poems
 Pulitzer Prize for poetry: Gwendolyn Brooks, Annie Allen (first African American winner)
 Bollingen Prize: Wallace Stevens
 Fellowship of the Academy of American Poets: E. E. Cummings
 Canada: Governor General's Award, poetry or drama: Of Time and the Lover, Charles Wreford Watson

Births
Death years link to the corresponding "[year] in poetry" article:

 January 1 – James Richardson, American poet and academic
 January 20 – Edward Hirsch, American poet and academic
 February 6 – Deborah Digges (died 2009), American poet and academic
 March 5 – Jack Bedson, Australian writer, poet, children's picture book author and university librarian
 April 4 – Charles Bernstein, American poet, critic, editor and teacher
 April 28:
 Carolyn Forché, American poet, editor and human rights advocate
 Brian Brett, Canadian poet and novelist
 May 9:
 Christopher Dewdney, avant-garde Canadian poet
 Jorie Graham American poet and the editor of numerous volumes of poetry
 Tato Laviera, Puerto Rician-American poet and author (died 2013)
 May 22 – Bernie Taupin, English lyricist
 June 5 – John Yau, American poet and critic
 June 21 – Anne Carson, Canadian poet, essayist, translator and academic
 July 1 – Ekram Ali, Indian Bengali poet and critic
 August 7 – T. R. Hummer, American
 August 8 – Philip Salom, Australian poet and novelist
 August 12 – Medbh McGuckian, Northern Ireland poet
 August 20 – Chase Twichell, American poet and owner of her own publishing company, Ausable Press
 September 1 – John Forbes (died 1998), Australian
 September 17 – Narendra Modi, Indian politician and poet
 September 30 – Shaunt Basmajian (died 1990), Canadian
 October 8 – Blake Morrison, English poet, critic and writer
 October 24 – Syed Kawsar Jamal Indian Bengali poet and essayist
 November 20 – E. Ethelbert Miller, African American
 December 20 – Sheenagh Pugh, British
 December 24 – Dana Gioia, American poet who retires early from his career as a corporate executive at General Foods to write full-time and later chairman of the National Endowment for the Arts
 Also:
 Anthony J. Bennett, Australian
 Charles Buckmaster (died 1972), Australian
 Frances Chung (died 1990), American
 Rodney Jones, American poet and academic
 William Logan, American poet, critic and academic
 Muntazir Baba (died 2018), Indian-born Pakistani Pashto poet
 Sandy Shreve, Canadian
 Nicolette Stasko, American-born Australian poet, teacher and editor; has a daughter with David Brooks
 Arthur Sze, American
 Grace Nichols, Guyanese in England
 Komninos Zervos (also known as "kominos"), Australian performance poet

Deaths
Birth years link to the corresponding "[year] in poetry" article:
 March 5 – Edgar Lee Masters (born 1868), American poet, biographer and dramatist
 May 4 – William Rose Benét (born 1886), American poet, writer, editor, and the older brother of Stephen Vincent Benét
 May 20 – John Gould Fletcher (born 1886), Pulitzer Prize-winning American, Imagist poet and author
 August 27 – Cesare Pavese (born 1908) Italian poet, novelist, literary critic and translator
 October 19 – Edna St. Vincent Millay, 58 (born 1892), of a heart attack;
 September 17 – Hoshino Tenchi 星野天知 (born 1862), Meiji period poet and martial arts master; a co-founder of Bungakukai literary magazine; 8th Grand Master and a teacher of the Yagyu Shinkage-ryu martial-arts school (surname: Hoshino)
 December 5 – Sri Aurobindo (Bengali: শ্রী অরবিন্দ Sri Ôrobindo) (born 1872), Indian  nationalist, poet, Yogi and spiritual Guru writing mostly in English
 December 25
 Ridgely Torrence (born 1874), American
 Xavier Villaurrutia (born 1903), Mexican poet and dramatist
 December 26 – James Stephens (born 1880), Irish poet and novelist
 Also:
 Khavirakpan (born 1895), Indian, Meitei language poet

See also

 Poetry
 List of poetry awards
 List of years in poetry

Notes

20th-century poetry
Poetry